Dr. Ambedkar Stadium or District Stadium is a main stadium in city of Bijapur, Karanataka. The ground has four Ranji Trophy matches from 1969 to 1995  including one match for Mysore cricket team in 1969. The ground was also host for Ranji One Day Trophy between Karnataka cricket team and Hyderabad cricket team in 1995. The match international cricketers like Vijay Bharadwaj, Venkatapathy Raju, Anil Kumble, Sunil Joshi, Mohammad Azharuddin and Venkatesh Prasad. The ground is named after Dr. Bhimrao Ambedkar.

References

External links 

 Cricinfo
 Crickearchive

Multi-purpose stadiums in India
Cricket grounds in Karnataka
Bijapur, Karnataka
Buildings and structures in Bijapur district
Sports venues completed in 1969
1969 establishments in Mysore State
20th-century architecture in India